The Unified Socialist Party (PSU) was a socialist political party in France, founded on April 3, 1960. It was originally led by Édouard Depreux (from its creation to 1967).

History 

PSU was born through the fusion of the Autonomous Socialist Party (PSA), the Socialist Left Union (UGS), and the group around the journal Tribune du Communisme. The latter was a splinter group of the French Communist Party (PCF), which had left after the 1956 inner conflict caused by the Soviet invasion of Hungary. The PSA and the UGS was a splinter group of the French Section of the Workers' International (SFIO) party, which had left in due to the repressive policy of the SFIO Prime Minister Guy Mollet during the Algerian War of Independence and his support to General Charles de Gaulle's return and the advent of the Fifth Republic under the military pressure. The three groups were closely linked from 1958. In 1961, the newly formed party was joined by Pierre Mendès-France, after he had left the Radical Party, and by Alain Savary, a former SFIO member as opposed as Mendès-France was to Charles de Gaulle's return to power in the turmoil of the May 1958 crisis.

In 1965, the PSU aligned with the SFIO and the PCF in supporting the candidacy of François Mitterrand in the presidential election. In contrast with the established socialist parties, the PSU also supported the student uprising of May 1968; it subsequently moved away from cooperation with the Socialist Party (PS) which succeeded the SFIO after 1969, and developed its own program, based on autogestion (workers' self-management).

Michel Rocard was the PSU candidate for the 1969 presidential elections, obtaining 3.61% of the vote in the first round. The party again campaigned for Mitterrand in the 1974 presidential elections — a move which encountered the opposition of the PSU's own supporters at grassroots level; the PSU did not sign Mitterrand's Common programme of the Left (agreed with the Communists), and a sizeable section of the party activists, led by Michel Rocard and Robert Chapuis, left to join the  renewed Socialist Party (believing that they could better function as a leftist tendency with the PS). The PSU supported the self-managed Lip factory.

PSU introduced Huguette Bouchardeau as its candidate for the 1981 presidential elections; she obtained 1.1% of the vote in the first round. In the 1988 presidential elections, the PSU supported the communist dissident candidate Pierre Juquin, who obtained 2.1% of the votes in the first round. In 1989, PSU merged with the New Left for Socialism, Ecology and Self-management (Juquin's movement), and formed the Red and Green Alternatives (nowadays integrated in the group Les Alternatifs).

National Secretaries
 1960–1967: Édouard Depreux
 1967–1973: Michel Rocard
 1973–1974: Robert Chapuis
 1974–1979: Michel Mousel
 1979–1981: Huguette Bouchardeau
 1981–1983: Jacques Salvator
 1983–1984: Serge Depaquit
 1984–1989: Jean-Claude Le Scornet

Electoral performance

National Assembly

Presidential candidates

Members 
Jean Maitron (1917–1987)
Pierre Vidal-Naquet (1930–2006)
 François Furet

See also 
Lip factory

References
 Marc Heurgon, Histoire du PSU, tome 1 : La Fondation et la guerre d'Algérie (1958 - 1962), Paris, La Découverte, Paris, 1994.
 Tudi Kernalegenn, François Prigent, Gilles Richard, Jacqueline Sainclivier (dir.), Le PSU vu d’en bas, Presses universitaires de Rennes, 2010 : 
 Noëlline Castagnez, Laurent Jalabert, Marc Lazar, Gilles Morin, Jean-François Sirinelli (dir.), Le Parti socialiste unifié, Histoire et postérité, Presses universitaires de Rennes, 2013 
 Bernard Ravenel, Quand la gauche se réinventait. Le PSU, histoire d'un parti visionnaire 1960-1989, La Découverte, Paris, 2016.

Political parties of the French Fifth Republic
Political parties established in 1960
Political parties disestablished in 1989
Social democratic parties in France
1960 establishments in France